Stadion Miejski im. Floriana Krygiera (Florian Krygier Municipal Stadium)  is a football stadium in Szczecin, Poland.  It is the home ground of Pogoń Szczecin. The stadium holds 18,027 people and was built in 1925.

It is named in honour of Florian Krygier, Polish football coach and an instrumental figure in the history of Pogoń Szczecin.

A major reconstruction initiated in 2019 to be completed in 2022, to reach the capacity of 21,163.

See also
List of football stadiums in Poland

References 

Szczecin
Sport in Szczecin
Buildings and structures in Szczecin
Sports venues in West Pomeranian Voivodeship
Pogoń Szczecin